This article provides details of international football games played by the Luxembourg national football team from 2020 to present.

Results

2020

2021

2022

Head to head records

Notes

References

Luxembourg national football team results
2020s in Luxembourgian sport